The 1st Men's Asian Fistball Championships (subsequently renamed Asia-Pacific Men's Fistball Championship) was held from 10 to 11 April 2014 at University of Lahore in Lahore, Punjab in Pakistan. It was the first major international fistball tournament to be held in the Asian region.

Pakistan were crowned Asian Fistball Champions for the first time, defeating India 3:2 in the final.

Participants  

The 4 teams that competed in the 2014 Men's Asian Fistball Championships in Pakistan were:

Structure 
All matches of the 2014 Asia-Pacific Fistball Championships were played to three winning sets (best of five sets).

Round Robin Stage 
 In the round robin stage the 4 competing teams played off against each other to determine rankings for the Finals.
 The last two round robin stage matches were not played due to being 'dead rubbers' as ranking positions were already decided.

Finals 
 The teams ranked #1 and #2 played off in the Final
 The teams ranked #3 and #4 played off in the bronze-medal match

Schedule and results

Round Robin Stage

Bronze-medal match (3rd/4th Placing)

Final

Final standings

References

Fistball
2014 in Asian sport